Tepuihyla tuberculosa, commonly known as the Canelos treefrog, is a species of frog in the family Hylidae. It is found in the upper Amazon Basin in western Brazil, Colombia, Ecuador, and Peru. It is a rare canopy species found in primary forest; beyond the habitat requirements, its biology is unknown.

References

Tuberculosa
Amphibians of Brazil
Amphibians of Colombia
Amphibians of Ecuador
Amphibians of Peru
Amphibians described in 1882
Taxonomy articles created by Polbot